Many places throughout North, Central, and South America take their names from the languages of the indigenous inhabitants of the area. The following list, organized by country, includes settlements, geographic features, and political subdivisions whose names are derived from indigenous languages.

Argentina
See list of Mapudungun placenames for the respective placenames in Argentina

Catamarca
Chubut Province
Curuzú Cuatiá
Machagai
Paraná
Puerto Iguazú
Quilmes
Tucumán Province
Ushuaia

Bolivia
Cochabamba
Copacabana
Guayaramerín
Oruro
Samaipata
Uyuni
Yacuíba

Brazil

Alagoas State
Arapiraca
Maceió

Ceará State
Iguatu
Maracanaú
Maranguape
Pacatuba

Minas Gerais State
Araxá
Paracatu

Pará State
Abaetetuba
Igarapé-Açu
Igarapé-Miri
Itaituba

Paraná State
Apucarana
Curitiba
Guarapuava
Paranaguá
Umuarama

Pernambuco State
Caruaru

Rio de Janeiro State
Araruama
Guanabara Bay
Niterói
Nova Iguaçu
Paraty
Piraí

Santa Catarina State
Itajai

São Paulo State
Araçariguama
Araçatuba
Araraquara
Araras
Caraguatatuba
Jaguariúna
Piracicaba
Ubatuba

Canada

Canada itself is a name derived from a Laurentian Iroquois word meaning "village" (c.f. Mohawk kaná:ta’). See Canada's name for more details.  Aboriginal names are widespread in Canada - for a full listing see List of place names in Canada of aboriginal origin.  Those listed here are only well-known, important or otherwise notable places.

Province and territory names

Ontario
Quebec - from Míkmaq kepék, "strait, narrows"
Manitoba
Saskatchewan
Nunavut
Yukon

British Columbia
NB Too many settlements, lakes, rivers, mountains and other items in British Columbia have indigenous names for all of them to be included here.  Only major or relatively notable items are listed.

Regions
Chilcotin
Cariboo
Okanagan
Kootenay
Lillooet Country
Nicola Country
Stikine Country
Nechako Country
Cowichan Valley
Shuswap Country
Omineca Country
Atlin Country
Slocan Valley
Haida Gwaii

Cities and towns
Nanaimo
Chilliwack
Coquitlam
Squamish
Qualicum Beach
Saanich
Sooke
Ucluelet
Kitimat
Keremeos
Spuzzum
Bella Coola
Bella Bella
Kamloops
Sicamous
Osoyoos
Skookumchuck
Lillooet
Penticton
Kelowna and West Kelowna
Spallumcheen
Malakwa
Slocan City

Rivers and lakes
Chilcotin River
Chilko Lake, Chilko River, Taseko River
Omineca River
Kechika River
Lillooet River
Okanagan Lake & Okanagan River
Similkameen River
Skeena River
Nass River
Homathko River
Nechako River
Squamish River
Klinaklini River
Stikine River
Alsek River
Tatshenshini River
Tagish Lake
Atlin Lake
Taku River
Cheakamus River
Elaho River
Nimpkish River
Somass River

Mountain ranges
Shulaps Range
Cayoosh Range
Lillooet Ranges
Chilcotin Ranges
Stikine Ranges
Cassiar Mountains
Cariboo Mountains
Kitimat Ranges
Omineca Mountains
Muskwa Ranges

Alberta
Kananaskis
Athabasca
Wetaskiwin - from the Cree word wītaskīwin-ispatinaw (ᐑᑕᐢᑮᐏᐣ ᐃᐢᐸᑎᓇᐤ), meaning "the hills where peace was made".

Saskatchewan
Saskatoon - from Cree misāskwatōmin, "saskatoon berry."

Manitou Lake
Little Manitou Lake
Manitou | North American Indian religion

Manitoba
Winnipeg—a transcription of a western Cree word meaning "muddy waters"
Manitoba -- "where the spirit (manitou) speaks"

Ontario
 Adjala-Tosorontio:Tosorontio is derived from the Huron (Wyandot) word meaning "beautiful mountain", and Adjala was the name of the wife of Chief Tecumseh.
 Algonquin Provincial Park: Named after the Algonquin (Anishinaabeg) people of Ontario.
 Almaguin Highlands: Derived from the words Algonquin and Magnetawan.
 Assiginack
 Algoma District
 Atikokan: Ojibwe for "caribou bones."
 Attawapiskat: "People of the parting of the rocks" from the Swampy Cree (Omushkegowuk) chat-a-wa-pis-shkag.
 Brantford: Named after Joseph Brant, a Mohawk leader.
 Cataraqui River
 Cayuga: Named for the Cayuga people of Ontario.
 Chinguacousy
 Couchiching: Derived from the Ojibwe gojijiing, meaning "inlet."
 Deseronto: Named for Captain John Deseronto, a native Mohawk leader who was a captain in the British Military Forces during the American Revolutionary War.
 Eramosa: Thought to be derived from the word un-ne-mo-sah (possibly meaning "black dog", "dead dog", or simply "dog").
 Esquesing Township: Mississauga Anishinaabe word ishkwessin, meaning "that which lies at the end", which was the original name for Bronte Creek.
 Etobicoke: "The place where the alders grow" from the word wadoopikaang in the Ojibwe language.
 Fort Erie: Iroquoian, erige, meaning "cat".
 Gananoque: Origin unknown, thought to be derived from Native languages for "place of health" or "meeting place" or "water running over rocks."
 Garafraxa: Possibly derived from the word for "panther country".
 Iroquois Falls: Named for the Iroquois people of Ontario.
 Kakabeka Falls: From the Ojibwe word gakaabikaa, "waterfall over a cliff".
 Kaministiquia River: Derived from gaa-ministigweyaa, an Ojibwe word meaning "(river) with islands".
 Kanata: Mohawk word meaning "village" or "settlement."
 Kapuskasing: Of Cree origin, possibly meaning "bend in river."
 Kawartha Lakes: An Anglicization of the word ka-wa-tha (from ka-wa-tae-gum-maug or gaa-waategamaag), a word coined in 1895 by Martha Whetung of the Curve Lake First Nation, meaning "land of reflections" in the Anishinaabe language. The word was subsequently changed by tourism promoters to Kawartha, with the meaning "bright waters and happy lands."
 Keewatin: Algonquian for "north wind." Derived from either kīwēhtin in Cree or giiwedin in Ojibwe.
 Madawaska: Named after an Algonquian band of the region known as Matouweskarini, meaning "people of the shallows".
 Magnetawan: Derived from the word for "swiftly flowing river."
 Manitoulin Island: Manitoulin is the English version, via French, of the Old Odawa name Manidoowaaling, which means "cave of the spirit".
 Manitouwadge: From manidoowaazh in Ojibwe, meaning "cave of the spirit."
 Manitowaning
 Manotick: Derived from Algonquin for "island."
 Matachewan
 Matawatchan
 Mattawa: "Meeting of the waters" in Ojibwe.
 M'Chigeeng
 Michipicoten: "Big bluffs" in Ojibwe.
 Missinaibi Provincial Park: Cree for "pictured waters," thought to refer to the pictographs found on rock faces along the river.
 Mississauga: Named for the native tribe of the Mississaugas
 Mississippi Mills: May originate from Mazinaa[bikinigan]-ziibi, Algonquian for "[painted] image river", referring to the pictographs found on Mazinaw Lake.
 Moosonee: Derived from the Cree word moosoneek, meaning "at the Moose (River)".
 Muskoka: Named for a First Nations chief of the 1850s, Chief Yellowhead or Mesqua Ukie.
 Napanee
 Nassagaweya: Derived from the Mississauga word nazhesahgewayyong, meaning "river with two outlets."
 Neebing
 Niagara: Iroquois in origin, meaning uncertain.
 Nipigon: May have originated from the Ojibwe word animbiigoong, meaning "at continuous water" or "at waters that extend [over the horizon]."
 Nipissing: From the Anishinaabe term nibiishing, meaning "at (some) water".
 Nottawasaga River: Derived from the Algonquin words for "Iroquois" and "river outlet".
 Ohsweken
 Oneida Nation of the Thames
 Onondaga
 Ontario
 Opasatika, "river lined with poplars".
 Oshawa: from the Ojibwe term aazhaway, meaning "crossing to the other side of a river or lake" or just "(a)cross".
 Otonabee: From the Ojibwe term "Odoonabii-ziibi" (Tullibee River). Otonabee comes from the words ode which means "heart" and odemgat that comes from "boiling water". It translates into "the river that beats like a heart in reference to the bubbling and boiling water of the rapids along the river"
 Ottawa: "To buy" from the word adaawe in the Anishinaabe language; adapted as the name of the Odawa people.
 Penetanguishene: believed to come from either the Wyandot language or from the Abenaki language via the Ojibwa language, meaning "land of the white rolling sands".
 Petawawa: From Algonquin meaning "where one hears the noise of the water"
 Powassan: From the word for "bend."
 Pukaskwa National Park
 Saugeen: Ojibwa language, Zaagiing, meaning outlet
 Shawanaga
 Scugog: Derived from the Mississauga word sigaog, which means "waves leap over a canoe."
 Shuniah: named after the Ojibwa word "zhooniyaa" for "money" or "silver"
 Sioux Narrows
 Sioux Lookout
 Tecumseh
 Tehkummah
 Temagami: from the Anishinaabe word dimiigami, "deep water(s)".
 Timiskaming: from the Algonquin language Temikami or Temikaming, meaning "deep waters".
 Toronto: from an Iroquoian language, but of uncertain derivation. Another story says it is derived from the Mohawk word "tkaronto" meaning "trees standing in the water".
 Tuscarora
 Tyendinaga: Derived from a variant spelling of Mohawk leader Joseph Brant's traditional Mohawk name, Thayendanegea.
 Wahnapitae: from the Anishinaabe waanabide, "be shaped like a hollow tooth".
 Wasaga Beach: Derived from "Nottawasaga," as above.
 Wawa
 Wawanosh
 Wikwemikong: from the Anishinaabe wiikwemikong, "Bay of Beavers" from Nishnaabe word "Amik" meaning beaver.
 Wyoming: derived from the Munsee name xwé:wamənk, meaning "at the big river flat."

Quebec

Regions
Abitibi
Kativik
Manicouagan
Nunavik 
Outaouais
Saguenay
Temiscamingue
Ungava

Towns and villages
Cascapédia
Chibougamau
Chicoutimi
Chisasibi
Hochelaga
Inukjuak
Ivujivik
Kahnawake
Kanesatake
Kenogami
Kuujjuaq
Matagami
Matapedia
Métabetchouan
Mistissini
Nemaska
Paspebiac
Puvirnituq
Salluit
Shawinigan
Shigawake
Stadacona
Tadoussac
Wemindji

Nunavut
Pangnirtung
Iqaluit

Northwest Territories
Aklavik
Tuktoyaktuk
Inuvik
Somba K'e - alternate official name, in the Dogrib language, of Yellowknife

Yukon
Yukon River 
Klondike

Caribbean

Bahamas
Bimini
Mayaguana

Cuba
Baracoa
Guanabacoa
Guantánamo

Dominican Republic
Bonao
Cibao
Dajabón
Higüey
Jarabacoa
Jaragua National Park
Jimaní
Mao
Yuna River

Grenada
Carriacou

Haiti
Gonaïves -from Gonaibo
Gonâve Island -from Guanabo 
Grand-Goâve -from Aguava
Jacmel
Léogâne -from Yaguana
Petit-Goâve -from Aguava

Puerto Rico
Bayamón
Caguas
Humacao
Jayuya
Maunabo

Saint Christopher and Nevis
Mount Liamuiga

Saint Vincent and the Grenadines
Bequia
Canouan

Trinidad
Arima
Aripo
Arouca
Carapo
Caroni
Chacachacare
Cachipa
Caura
Chaguanas
Chaguaramas
Couva
Cunupia
Curucaye
Guaico
Guanapo
Guaracara
Guayaguayare
Icacos
Iere
Macoya
Mayaro
Naparima
Nariva
Oropuche
Ortoire (disambiguation)
Paria
Salybia
Siparia
Tamana
Tumpuna
Tunapuna
Yarra

Chile

List of Mapudungun placenames

Non-Mapudungun Placenames:
Arica
Calama
Copiapó
Coquimbo
Coyhaique
Iquique
Pali-Aike National Park
Torres del Paine National Park

Colombia 

 Arauca
 Bogotá - from former main Muisca settlement Bacatá
 Cali - from Calima
 Cúcuta
 Duitama - from Tundama
 Ibagué - from Pijao cacique Ibagué
 Maicao
 Nemocón
 Sogamoso - from Suamox
 Tunja - from former Muisca settlement Hunza
 Zipaquirá - Muysccubun: "land of the zipa" or "city of our father"

Ecuador
Ambato
Babahoyo
Chimborazo
Cotopaxi
Guayaquil
Otavalo
Quito
Tulcán
Tungurahua

El Salvador
Cojutepeque
Cuscatlán Department
Sensuntepeque
Usulután
 Zacatecoluca

Guatemala 
The country name comes from Nahuatl Cuauhtēmallān, "place of many trees", a translation of Kʼicheʼ K’ii’chee’, "many trees" (="forest").

Nahuatl Placenames:
Chichicastenango
Chimaltenango
Chiquimula
Escuintla
Huehuetenango- from Nahuatl, the original Mayan name was Xinabahul
Jalapa
Jutiapa
Lake Atitlán
Mazatenango
Quetzaltenango- from Nahuatl, the original Mayan name was Xelajú
Zacapa

Mayan Placenames:
Lake Petén Itzá

Guyana
Demerara
Kaieteur Falls

Honduras
Choluteca
Juticalpa
Nacaome
Siguatepeque
Tegucigalpa

Mexico
The name of Mexico is the Nahuatl name for the island in the middle of Lake Texcoco where the Aztecs had their capital, its etymology is opaque.

States
Chiapas- Believed to derive from the ancient city of Chiapan, which means "the place where the chia sage grows" in Náhuatl.
Chihuahua- May come from "dry place" in an unknown Indian language.
Coahuila- possibly from the Nahuatl word Cuauhillan - "Place of trees"
Guanajuato- Means "hill of frogs" in the Purépecha language 
Michoacán- Translates to "the place of the fishermen" from the Nahuatl word michhuahcan.
Nayarit- derived from the endonym of the Cora people "naayarite"
Oaxaca-Comes from the Nahuatl word huaxyácac or "place of the guaje trees".
Querétaro- Could come from the Otomi meaning "the great ball game" or the Purépecha language meaning "place of stones".
Tamaulipas- derives from tamaholipa a Huastec term that could mean "place where high hills".
Tlaxcala- Means "Place of Maize tortilla". in Nahuatl
Zacatecas- Named after the Zacatec; an indigenous nation in the area. It means "inhabitants of the grassland" in Nahuatl.

Chiapas
Tuxtla Gutiérrez

Guerrero
Acapulco
Chilpancingo
Ixtapa
Zihuatanejo

Mexico City
Azcapotzalco
Chapultepec
Coyoacán
Cuauhtémoc
Iztapalapa
Xochimilco

Michoacán
Janitzio
Tzintzuntzan

Quintana Roo
Cancún
Chetumal
Cozumel
Sian Ka'an

Sinaloa
Culiacán
Los Mochis
Mazatlán

Sonora
Guaymas
Navojoa

State of Mexico
Chalco
Ciudad Nezahualcóyotl
Naucalpan
Texcoco
Toluca

Veracruz
Coatzacoalcos
Minatitlán
Xalapa

Yucatán
Chicxulub (both the town and the impact crater)
Izamal
Oxkutzcab
Tekax
Ticul
Tizimín

Nicaragua
Chinandega
Jinotega
Matagalpa
Masaya
Ometepe
Tipitapa

Panama
Chitré
Guna Yala
Macaracas
Natá
Panama
Penonomé
Taboga Island

Paraguay
Caaguazú
Caacupé
Humaitá
Itá
Itapúa Department
Itauguá
Ypacaraí

Peru
Abancay
Apurímac River
Arequipa
Ayacucho
Cajamarca
Chachapoyas
Chancay
Chiclayo
Chimbote
Chincha Alta
Cusco
Huancayo
Huari
Iquitos
Lambayeque
Moche
Moyobamba
Ollantaytambo
Pachacamac
Piura
Pucallpa
Puquio
Tumbes
Urubamba River
Yurimaguas

Suriname
Paramaribo
Saramacca River

United States

Uruguay
Tacuarembó

Venezuela
Acarigua
Aragua
Baruta
Cagua
Carabobo
Caracas
Carúpano
Cerro Sarisariñama
Cúa
Cumaná
Guacara
Guaicaipuro
Guanare
Laguna de Tacarigua
Los Teques
Maracaibo
Naguanagua
Orinoco
Táchira
Upata

See also
 List of place names in Canada of aboriginal origin
 List of Chinook Jargon placenames

References

Bibliography
 Bright, William (2004). Native American Place Names of the United States. Norman: University of Oklahoma Press.
 Campbell, Lyle (1997). American Indian Languages: The Historical Linguistics of Native America. Oxford: Oxford University Press.
O'Brien, Frank Waabu (2010). "Understanding Indian Place Names in Southern New England".  Colorado: Bauu Press. 

Placenames of indigenous origin
Indigenous origin
Americas Indigenous Origin
Americas Indigenous Origin
 Americas